Torbenia is a genus of butterflies, commonly called Zulus, in the family Lycaenidae. They are endemic to the Afrotropical realm. The five species were formerly placed in Ornipholidotos. The genus is named after Torben Bjørn Larsen.

Species
Listed alphabetically:
Torbenia aurivilliusi (Stempffer, 1967)
Torbenia larseni (Stempffer, 1969)
Torbenia persimilis Libert, 2000
Torbenia stempfferi Collins & Larsen, 2000
Torbenia wojtusiaki Libert, 2000

References

Poritiinae
Butterfly genera